Bocas Ordinárias (Portuguese for "Ordinary Mouths") is the fifth album by Brazilian alternative rock band Charlie Brown Jr., released in December 2002 through EMI. Vocalist Chorão described it as a "sequel of sorts" to Abalando a Sua Fábrica, in which it continues the heavy aggressiveness of its predecessor, and dedicated it to his friend, fellow singer Cássia Eller, who died the year prior. The album's title comes from a Portuguese popular expression; saying someone has a "boca ordinária" means that they are foulmouthed. Chorão got acquainted with the expression after reading a negative critic from a Portuguese newspaper after the band performed in Portugal in 2002 as part of their international tour, and decided it would be the name of their next album.

Considered one of the band's finest albums by fans and critics alike, it spawned the hit singles "Papo Reto (Prazer É Sexo, o Resto É Negócio)" and "Só por uma Noite", included in the soundtrack of the tenth season of long-running soap opera Malhação (2003–2004). Also notable are "Baader–Meinhof Blues", a cover of Legião Urbana – the first cover version recorded by Charlie Brown Jr. –, and "My Mini Ramp", the band's first song fully written in English since the release of their self-titled demo tape in 1994. It sold over 500,000 copies, receiving a Gold certification by Pro-Música Brasil, and was also nominated for a Latin Grammy Award for Best Portuguese Language Rock or Alternative Album in 2003.

In 2019, to celebrate its 17th anniversary, Universal Music re-released Bocas Ordinárias in vinyl format.

Critical reception
Writing for Galeria Musical, Anderson Nascimento gave the album a positive review, rating it with 4 stars out of 5 and calling it a "cleaner" release with more "understandable" songs. Mauro Ferreira of ISTOÉ, giving it 3 out of 4 stars, praised its "poetic rawness", while website Universo Musical called it the band's "heaviest and most mature release to date". Ricardo Schott of Central da Música considered it "Charlie Brown Jr.'s best album ever", and newspaper Estadão noticed the "confessional" tone of its songs. Website La Cumbuca included Bocas Ordinárias in 196th place in its list of the Top 200 Brazilian Albums of the 2000s.

Track listing

Personnel
 Charlie Brown Jr.
 Chorão – vocals
 Champignon – bass guitar
 Marcão – guitar
 Renato Pelado – drums

Production
 Jorge Davidson – A&R
 Charlie Brown Jr. – arrangements
 Tadeu Patolla – production
 Tadeu Patolla, Paulo Anhaia, Lampadinha and Renato Patriarca – recording
 Edgar, Pistão and Nilton Baloni – recording assistants
 Tadeu Patolla and Paulo Anhaia – mixing
 Rodrigo Castanho – mastering
 Celso Costa – production assistant
 Adrian Philippe – executive production

Certifications

References

2002 albums
EMI Records albums
Charlie Brown Jr. albums